Vallentine Mitchell is  a publishing company based in Elstree, Hertfordshire, England. 
The company publishes books on Jewish-related topics. One of its earliest books was the first English-language edition of The Diary of Anne Frank. From the 1940s to the 1970s it was a publishing venture linked with The Jewish Chronicle.  Frank Cass bought the company in 1971.

See also
Publication of Anne Frank's Diary in English

References

External links
 Official website

1940s establishments in England
Book publishing companies of England
Companies based in Hertsmere
Publishing companies established in the 1940s